Five Stone Arch Bridges is a cluster of stone arch bridges in Hillsborough, New Hampshire, United States that have been designated as a National Historic Civil Engineering Landmark by the American Society of Civil Engineers.

History
The stone arch bridges were built during the 19th century, when there was a need for sturdier construction to replace weaker wooden bridges. The design required exceptional skill by stonecutters. Each stone had to fit just right. At one time there were twelve stone arch bridges in Hillsborough. The designation of the five remaining structures as a National Historic Civil Engineering Landmark by the American Society of Civil Engineers (ASCE) in 2002 had much to do with their close proximity to one another.

Fred Rhyner, a member of the ASCE New Hampshire Section and a vice president at Haley & Aldrich Engineering in Manchester, filed the nomination application for the historic landmark. His interest in the remarkable cluster of stone arch bridges began while he was working on a New Hampshire DOT bridge project on the Second New Hampshire Turnpike in 1996. It took three years to gather all the information together. The application was filed in 1999.

The Hillsborough town website states that the arch bridge near U.S. Route 202 (Sawyer Bridge) "is going to become the focal point of a public park," although it is unclear if there are active plans to do this. Selectman Robert Buker described the park surrounding the stone arch bridge at Route 202 as an attempt to balance commercial growth on the west end of town with historic preservation. A New Hampshire historical marker and an ASCE landmark plaque for the stone arch bridges are both located near Sawyer Bridge.

Bridges

See also
New Hampshire Historical Marker No. 203: Stone Arch Bridges

References

External links
American Society of Civil Engineers - Five Stone Arch Bridges

Historic Civil Engineering Landmarks
Road bridges in New Hampshire
Hillsborough, New Hampshire
Bridges in Hillsborough County, New Hampshire
Stone arch bridges in the United States